WSIP-FM (98.9 FM) is a radio station broadcasting a New Country format.  Licensed to Paintsville, Kentucky, United States.  The station is currently owned by Forcht Broadcasting and features programming from CBS News Radio. Though WSIP-AM has aired since 1949, the FM station first aired on January 20, 1965.

References

External links

SIP-FM
Paintsville, Kentucky